News18 Bangla is a 24-hour Bengali news channel owned by Network 18, a subsidiary of Reliance Industries. This channel is a free-to-air and was launched on 11 March 2014. It has changed its name on 12 March 2018 from ETV News Bangla to News18 Bangla.

References

External links

 

Television channels and stations established in 2014
24-hour television news channels in India
Television stations in Kolkata
Bengali-language television channels in India
Network18 Group
2014 establishments in West Bengal